Bad Scene, Everyone's Fault is a tribute album to the band Jawbreaker, released in 2003 by Dying Wish Records. It includes bands of the post-hardcore, punk rock, pop punk, and emo genres covering Jawbreaker songs. The album is named after a song on Jawbreaker's 1995 album Dear You.

Reception 
Scott Heisel of Punknews.org rated the album three and a half stars out of five, calling it "rather solid from start to finish, [seeming] like a heartfelt tribute to the Bay Area punk trio, as opposed to an easy cash-in disc." Describing Bigwig and Face to Face's tracks as "virtually note-for-note renditions of the originals", he complimented them for the clarity of their vocals, something lacking in the original Jawbreaker recordings. He praised Duvall's cover of "Busy" as "one of the most beautiful cover songs [by anyone, of anyone] that I've ever heard", and cited The Æffect's version of "Boxcar" as his favorite track:
He was more critical of some of the other tracks, calling Sparta's acoustic rendition of "Kiss the Bottle" "a bit too foreign and sterile" and noting that "The Reunion Show's MOOG-a-riffic sound fails them on 'Unlisted Track', sounding more chaotic than poppy."

Track listing

Personnel 
 Sergio Sandino – artwork
 Jake Wallace – art direction and design
 Alan Douches – mastering
 Dave DeCeglie – producer and engineering

References 

Tribute albums
2003 compilation albums
Dying Wish Records compilation albums